Alfresco may refer to:

 Al fresco, or fresco, a technique of mural painting
 Al fresco dining
 Alfresco Software, an open-source content-management system
 Alfresco (TV series), a 1980s British television comedy series
 Al fresco, colloquial allusion meaning the same as going commando